Valea Hotarului River may refer to:
 Valea Hotarului, a tributary of the Valea Bădenilor in Argeș County, Romania
 Valea Hotarului, a tributary of the Dâmbovița in Argeș County, Romania